Dimitrios Adamou (1914-1991) was a Greek politician and a writer, who from 1981 until 1987, was a Member of the European Parliament, representing Greece for the Communist Party. He was born at Pyrsogianni, Ioannina. From 1989 to his death served as chairman of the Greek Writers' Association.

He died on 24 December 1991.

References 

1991 deaths
1914 births
MEPs for Greece 1981–1984
MEPs for Greece 1984–1989
Communist Party of Greece MEPs
People from Ioannina (regional unit)